Mettau may refer to:
Mettau, Switzerland
Metuje, a river in the Czech Republic